The 2006 LNBP was the 7th season of the Liga Nacional de Baloncesto Profesional, one of the professional basketball leagues of Mexico. It started on July 6, 2006 and ended on November 17, 2006. The league title was won by Soles de Mexicali, which defeated Halcones UV Xalapa in the championship series, 4–3.

Format 
24 teams participate. The teams are divided in two groups of 12 teams each, called Zonas (zones): Zona Norte (North) and Zona Sur (South). The first 8 teams in each group qualify for the playoffs. The group playoffs have quarterfinals (best-of-5), semifinals (best-of-7) and finals (best-of-7). The winner of each group series qualify for the championship series (best-of-7), named Final de Finales (Final of Finals).

Teams

Regular season

Zona Norte standings

Zona Sur standings

Playoffs 
Source

Copa Independencia 
The third edition of the Copa Independencia took place between July 18 and October 3, 2006. The LNBP changed the format of the competition: all the 24 teams played, divided in groups of 4 teams each. The two best teams of each group advanced to the following round.

The competition was won by Lobos Grises de la UAD, which defeated Halcones UV Xalapa over 2 games: the first saw Lobos Grises win, 114–108; the second game went to overtime and saw Halcones win, 107–102, but the Lobos Grises won the series, having scored more points overall.

Quarterfinals

First leg 
All games played on August 29.

 Soles de Mexicali 92, Lobos Grises de la UAD 85
 Correcaminos UAT Reynosa 91, Galgos de Tijuana 83
 Halcones UV Xalapa 106, Pioneros de Quintana Roo 102
 Guerreros de Morelia 102, Panteras de Aguascalientes 80

Second leg 
All games played on September 5.

 Lobos Grises de la UAD 114, Soles de Mexicali 78
 Correcaminos UAT Reynosa 105, Galgos 101
 Halcones UV Xalapa 96, Pioneros de Quintana Roo 87
 Panteras de Aguascalientes 86, Guerreros de Morelia 84

Qualified for the semifinals: Correcaminos UAT Reynosa, Guerreros de Morelia, Halcones UV Xalapa, Lobos Grises de la UAD.

Semifinals

First leg 
All games played on September 12.

 Correcaminos UAT Reynosa 113, Lobos Grises de la UAD 106
 Halcones UV Xalapa 124, Guerreros de Morelia 102

Second leg 
All games played on September 19.

 Lobos Grises de la UAD 118, Correcaminos UAT Reynosa 99
 Halcones UV Xalapa 124, Guerreros de Morelia 87

Qualified for the final game: Halcones UV Xalapa, Lobos Grises de la UAD.

Final 
 September 26: Lobos Grises de la UAD 114, Halcones UV Xalapa 108
 October 3: Halcones UV Xalapa 107, Lobos Grises de la UAD 102 (OT)

Lobos Grises de la UAD wins the 2006 Copa Independencia.

All-Star Game 
The 2006 LNBP All-Star Game was played in Mérida, Yucatán at the Gimnasio Polifuncional on September 19, 2006. The game format was changed: from 2000 to 2005, the game was played between a team of foreign players, and a team of Mexican players; in 2006 the game became Zona Norte vs. Zona Sur, with no distinction between foreign and Mexican players. Zona Norte won, 122–104. The game MVP was Galen Robinson.

Teams 

Zona Norte
  Miguel Acuña (Lobos Grises de la UAD)
  Myron Allen (Lobos Grises de la UAD)
  Noé Alonzo (Correcaminos UAT Matamoros)
  Romel Beck (Correcaminos UAT Victoria)
  Steven Esselink (Cimarrones de Ensenada)
  Alex Falcón (Lobos de la UAdeC)
  Nick Jones (Lobos Grises de la UAD)
  Greg Lewis (Soles de Mexicali)
  Horacio Llamas (Soles de Mexicali)
  Jamario Moon (Fuerza Regia de Monterrey)
  Galen Robinson (Correcaminos UAT Reynosa)
  Jamaal Thomas (Santos Reales de San Luis)
 Coaches:  Lewis LaSalle Taylor (Lobos Grises de la UAD) and  José Luis Yebra (Correcaminos UAT Reynosa)

Zona Sur
  Víctor Ávila (Halcones UV Xalapa)
  Boubacar Aw (La Ola Roja del Distrito Federal)
  Samuel Bowie (Halcones UV Xalapa)
  Juan Pablo Bravo (Guerreros de Morelia)
  Charles Byrd (Halcones UV Veracruz)
  Daryl Dorsey (Mayas de Yucatán)
  Devon Ford (Panteras de Aguascalientes)
  Reggie Jordan (Cometas de Querétaro)
  Yahir Malpica (Bucaneros de Campeche)
  Omar Quintero (Pioneros de Quintana Roo)
  Jorge Rochín (Halcones UV Veracruz)
  Enrique Zúñiga (Lechugueros de León)
 Coaches:  José Luis Arroyos (Halcones UV Veracruz) and  Reggie Fox (Cometas de Querétaro)

References

External links 
 2006 LNBP season on Latinbasket.com

LNBP seasons
2006 in Mexican sports
2006–07 in North American basketball